"I Don't Wanna Stop" is the first single from heavy metal singer Ozzy Osbourne's 10th studio album, Black Rain. The song was first announced and released through Osbourne's website.

Background
"I Don't Wanna Stop" was named the official theme song to the WWE PPV Judgment Day. A week prior to the event, Osbourne performed the song on the May 18, 2007 edition of WWE Friday Night SmackDown that was taped at the 1st Mariner Arena in Baltimore, Maryland on May 15. The episode aired outside the US on Sky Sports in the UK, FOX8 in Australia, and The Score in Canada also on May 18.

The song is also the theme song of professional wrestler Brent Albright. The song was also played on BBC 1 on May 25 on Friday Night with Jonathan Ross. It was also performed at the 2nd annual VH1 Rock Honors award show, followed by "Crazy Train" and "Bark at the Moon".

The song was included in the in-game soundtrack to Madden NFL 08, which was released in August 2007.  The song is also featured in the 5th and final tier of Guitar Hero: On Tour, notable for its unusually difficult solo section, and was released as downloadable content for the Rock Band video game series on June 15, 2010.

Osbourne performed this song, along with "Crazy Train" and "Not Going Away" on comedian Jimmy Kimmel's self named show, Jimmy Kimmel Live!.

The song was nominated for Best Hard Rock Performance at the 50th Annual Grammy Awards, but lost to Foo Fighters' "The Pretender".

Chart history

Personnel
Ozzy Osbourne - vocals
Zakk Wylde - electric guitar , Keyboards
Rob "Blasko" Nicholson - bass
Mike Bordin - drums

References

2007 singles
Ozzy Osbourne songs
Songs written by Ozzy Osbourne
Songs written by Zakk Wylde
Songs written by Kevin Churko
2007 songs
Song recordings produced by Kevin Churko
Epic Records singles